Communist Party of India (Marxist–Leninist) Red Flag (CPI (ML) Red Flag) was formed in 1988 as a break-away from the Central Reorganisation Committee, CPI (ML).

The party's main base of support was in Kerala, where it emerged as the major ML faction. It also expanded to other states including Karnataka, Madhya Pradesh, Maharashtra, Chhattisgarh, West Bengal and Odisha. 

In 2003 a large section of the party in Kerala, including the majority in the Kerala State Committee, broke away, and to create a parallel CPI (ML) Red Flag. The split was led by the Kerala state secretary of the party, P.C. Unnichekkan. This party continues to use the name CPI (ML) Red Flag and supports  Left Democratic Front in Kerala. 

Ahead of the Lok Sabha elections in 2004 CPI(ML) Red Flag and CPI (ML) took the initiative to form a united front of revolutionary communists. In that front they were able to gather, more than CPI (ML) and CPI (ML) Red Flag, Centre of Communist Revolutionaries (West Bengal), Lal Nishan Party (Leninvadi), Marxist Communist Party of India, Marxist-Leninist Committee, New Socialist Movement, Gujarat, Provisional Central Committee, Communist Party of India (Marxist-Leninist) and Bhagat Singh Vichar Manch. 

In Kerala a Left Front was formed ahead of the elections together with BTR-EMS-AKG Janakeeya Samskarika Vedi of V.B. Cheriyan.

CPI (ML) Red Flag merged with Kanu Sanyal's Communist Party of India (Marxist-Leninist) at a unity conference in Vijayawada January 2005

See also
 :Category:Mass organisations of CPI(ML) Red Flag
 P.C. Unnichekkan
 Souren Bose

References

1988 establishments in India
2005 disestablishments in India
Political parties established in 1988
Political parties disestablished in 2005
Red Flag
International Conference of Marxist–Leninist Parties and Organizations (International Newsletter)
Defunct Maoist organisations in India